Barry Martin Simon  (born 16 April 1946)  is an American mathematical physicist and was the IBM professor of Mathematics and Theoretical Physics at Caltech, known for his prolific contributions in spectral theory, functional analysis, and nonrelativistic quantum mechanics (particularly Schrödinger operators), including the connections to atomic and molecular physics. He has authored more than 400 publications on mathematics and physics.

His work has focused on broad areas of mathematical physics and analysis covering: quantum field theory, statistical mechanics, Brownian motion, random matrix theory, general nonrelativistic quantum mechanics (including N-body systems and resonances), nonrelativistic quantum mechanics in electric and magnetic fields, the semi-classical limit, the singular continuous spectrum, random and ergodic Schrödinger operators, orthogonal polynomials, and non-selfadjoint spectral theory.

Early life
Barry Simon's mother was a school teacher, his father was an accountant. Simon attended James Madison High School in Brooklyn.

Career
During his high school years, Simon started attending college courses for highly gifted pupils at Columbia University. In 1962, Simon won a MAA mathematics competition. The New York Times reported that in order to receive full credits for a faultless test result he had to make a submission with MAA. In this submission he proved that one of the problems posed in the test was ambiguous.

In 1962, Simon entered Harvard with a stipend. He became a Putnam Fellow in 1965 at 19 years old. He received his AB in 1966 from Harvard College and his PhD in Physics at Princeton University in 1970, supervised by Arthur Strong Wightman. His dissertation dealt with Quantum mechanics for Hamiltonians defined as quadratic forms.

Following his doctoral studies, Simon took a professorship at Princeton for several years, often working with colleague Elliott H. Lieb on the Thomas-Fermi Theory and Hartree-Fock Theory of atoms in addition to phase transitions and mentoring many of the same students as Lieb. He eventually was persuaded to take a post at Caltech, from which he retired in the summer of 2016.

His status is legendary in mathematical physics and he is renowned for his ability to write scientific manuscripts "in five percent of the time ordinary mortals need to write such papers."

A former graduate student of Simon's, in a tale revealing of his brilliance, once stated:

Honors and awards
1974: Invited Speaker at the International Congress of Mathematicians in Vancouver
1981: Elected fellow of the American Physical Society
1990: Elected correspondent member of the Austrian Academy of Sciences
2005: Elected fellow of the American Academy of Arts and Sciences
2012: Elected fellow of the American Mathematical Society
2012: Awarded the Henri Poincaré Prize
2015: Awarded the Bolyai Prize of the Hungarian Academy of Sciences
2016: Awarded the Steele Prize for Lifetime achievements
2018: Dannie Heineman Prize for Mathematical Physics from the American Physical Society
2019: Elected to the National Academy of Sciences

Selected publications

Articles
Resonances in n-body quantum systems with dilatation analytic potentials and the foundations of time-dependent perturbation theory, Annals of Mathematics 97 (1973), 247–274  (over 700 citations)
(with F. Guerra and L. Rosen) The P(φ)2 quantum theory as classical statistical mechanics, Annals of Mathematics 101 (1975), 111–259 
(with E. Lieb) The Thomas-Fermi theory of atoms, molecules and solids, Advances in Mathematics 23 (1977), 22–116  (over 700 citations)
(with J. Fröhlich and T. Spencer) Infrared bounds, phase transitions and continuous symmetry breaking, Commun. Math. Phys. 50 (1976), 79–85 
(with P. Perry and I. M. Sigal) Spectral analysis of multiparticle Schrödinger operators, Annals of Mathematics 114 (1981), 519–567 
 Schrödinger semigroups, Bulletin of the American Mathematical Society 7 (1982), 447–526  (over 1500 citations)
(with M. Aizenman) Brownian motion and Harnack's inequality for Schrödinger operators, Commun. Pure Appl. Math. 35 (1982), 209–273 (over 600 citations)
Holonomy, the quantum adiabatic theorem and Berry's phase, Phys. Rev. Lett. 51 (1983), 2167–2170  (over 2050 citations)
(with Joseph E. Avron and Ruedi Seiler) Homotopy and quantization in condensed matter physics, Phys. Rev. Lett. 51 (1983) 51–53  (over 600 citations)
Semiclassical analysis of low lying eigenvalues, II. Tunneling, Annals of Mathematics 120 (1984), 89–118 
(with T. Wolff) Singular continuous spectrum under rank one perturbations and localization for random Hamiltonians, Commun. Pure Appl. Math. 39 (1986), 75–90 
Operators with singular continuous spectrum: I. General operators, Annals of Mathematics 141 (1995), 131–145

Books
 Quantum mechanics for hamiltonians defined as quadratic forms. Princeton University Press, Princeton NJ 1971, .
 with Michael C. Reed: Methods of Modern Mathematical Physics. 4 vols. Academic Press, New York, NY etc. 1972–1978;
 vol. 1: Functional Analysis. 1972, ;
 vol. 2: Fourier Analysis, Self-Adjointness. 1975, ;
 vol. 3: Scattering Theory. Academic Press, 1979, ;
 vol. 4: Analysis of Operators. Academic Press, 1978, .
 The  Euclidean (Quantum) Field Theory. Princeton University Press, Princeton NJ 1974, .
 as editor with Elliott H. Lieb and Arthur S. Wightman: Studies in mathematical physics. Essays in Honor of Valentine Bargmann. Princeton University Press, Princeton NJ 1976, contributions by Barry Simon:
 pp. 305–326: On the number of bound states of two body Schrödinger operators – a review. online PDF; 377 kB.
 pp. 327–349: Quantum dynamics: from automorphism to hamiltonian. online PDF; 573 kB.
 Functional integration and quantum physics (= Pure and Applied Mathematics. 86). Academic Press, New York NY etc. 1979, ISBN 0-12-644250-9 (2nd edition: American Mathematical Society, Providence RI 2005).
 Trace Ideals and their applications (= London Mathematical Society. Lecture Note Series. 35). Cambridge University Press, Cambridge etc. 1979,  (2nd edition: (= Mathematical Surveys and Monographs. 120). American Mathematical Society, Providence RI 2005).
 with Hans L. Cycon, Richard G. Froese, and Werner Kirsch: Schrödinger Operators. Springer, Berlin etc. 1987,  (corrected and extended 2nd printing: Springer 2008).
 The Statistical mechanics of lattice gases. vol. 1. Princeton University Press, Princeton NJ 1993, .
 Orthogonal polynomials on the unit circle (= American Mathematical Society Colloquium Publications. 54, 1–2). 2 vols. American Mathematical Society, Providence RI 2005;
 vol. 1: Classical theory. 2005, ;
 vol. 2: Spectral theory. 2005, .
 Convexity. An analytic viewpoint (= Cambridge Tracts in Mathematics. 187). Cambridge University Press, Cambridge etc. 2011, .
 Szegő´s theorem and its descendants. Spectral theory for  perturbations of orthogonal polynomials. Princeton University Press, Princeton NJ 2011, .
 A Comprehensive Course in Analysis. 4 vols. with vol. 2 published in 2 parts, American Mathematical Society, Providence RI 2015, .
 vol. 1: Real Analysis.
 vol. 2A: Basic Complex Analysis.
 vol. 2B: Advanced Complex Analysis.
 vol. 3: Harmonic Analysis.
 vol. 4: Operator Theory.
 Loewner's theorem on monotone matrix functions Springer, 2019,

See also
 Simon problems

References

Further reading
 Spectral Theory and Mathematical Physics: A Festschrift in Honor of Barry Simon's 60th Birthday: Ergodic Schrödinger Operators, Singular Spectrum, Orthogonal Polynomials, and Inverse Spectral Theory

External links
Prof. Simon's Homepage
SimonFest
Barry Simon's 60th Birthday Celebration: Reminiscences of Friends, Relatives, and Colleagues — Barry Stories from SimonFest

Publications and citations at Google Scholar
 
  (KBS Fest at ISI Bangalore)
 
 
 
 
 
 Caltech Heritage Project, interviews from 2021 & 2022
  (interview Thursday Nov. 18, 2021)
 
  (interview Friday Nov. 26, 2021)
 
  (interview Thursday Dec. 2, 2021)
 
  (interview Thursday Dec. 9, 2021)
 
  (interview Wednesday Dec. 15, 2021)
 
  (interview Thursday Dec. 23, 2021)
  (interview March 7, 2022)

1946 births
Living people
20th-century American mathematicians
21st-century American mathematicians
21st-century American physicists
Jewish American physicists
Harvard University alumni
Princeton University alumni
Princeton University faculty
California Institute of Technology faculty
Putnam Fellows
Fellows of the American Mathematical Society
Mathematical physicists
Operator theorists
James Madison High School (Brooklyn) alumni
Mathematicians from New York (state)
Members of the United States National Academy of Sciences
Fellows of the American Physical Society
21st-century American Jews